Pavlos Logaras (born 18 June 2002) is a Greek professional footballer who plays as a centre-back for Super League 2 club Niki Volos, on loan from PAOK B.

Personal life
Logaras' father, Panagiotis, is a former professional goalkeeper.

References

1998 births
Living people
Greek footballers
Super League Greece players
Super League Greece 2 players
Association football defenders
Footballers from Alexandroupolis
PAOK FC players
Volos N.F.C. players
PAOK FC B players
Niki Volos F.C. players